Aggie Hall is a historic former gymnasium in Bruno, Arkansas, a short way south of Arkansas Highway 235.  It is a single-story stone structure, topped by a hip roof which has a clerestory section (also hip-roofed) at its center.  The clerestory is finished in weatherboard; both roof lines have Craftsman-style exposed rafter ends.  The building was erected in 1926 by the student members of the Lincoln Aggie Club, believed to be the first chapter established (in 1921) of the Future Farmers of America, and was originally intended as a gymnasium for the adjacent Bruno Agricultural School and as a location for the club's activities.

The building was listed on the National Register of Historic Places in 1992, at which time it was being used as a warehouse.

See also
 Aggie Workshop: 1935 Bruno Agricultural School workshop
 Bruno School Building: 1920 Bruno Agricultura School main building
 Hirst-Mathew Hall: 1929 Bruno Agricultural School classrooms
 National Register of Historic Places listings in Marion County, Arkansas

References

Sports venues on the National Register of Historic Places in Arkansas
National Register of Historic Places in Marion County, Arkansas
School buildings completed in 1926
Education in Marion County, Arkansas
1926 establishments in Arkansas
Gyms in the United States
American Craftsman architecture in Arkansas
Bungalow architecture in Arkansas
Clubhouses on the National Register of Historic Places in Arkansas
Sports venues completed in 1926
National FFA Organization